Live World Tour: Catch Me in Seoul (printed as TVXQ! The 4th World Tour "Catch Me in Seoul") is a live album by South Korean pop duo TVXQ. It was recorded at the Olympic Gymnastics Arena from November 17–18, 2012, during the Seoul stop for the duo's fourth concert tour, Catch Me: Live World Tour.

The tour's official photo book, printed at 148 pages, was released on May 9, 2014. The official CD recording, which was released on May 22, 2014, features 29 live recordings and two bonus tracks, which are studio versions of previously unreleased songs. The DVD, released on August 14, 2014, includes a special concert making film and additional stage footage.

Chart performance
The CD release of Catch Me in Seoul debuted at number three on South Korea's Gaon Albums Chart and at number six on the monthly chart, selling 19,979 units. In Japan, the live album debuted at number fifty-nine on Japan's Oricon Albums Chart, selling 1,245 imported copies in its first week of release in Japan. Catch Me in Seoul peaked at number nineteen on its second week of release in Japan, selling 5,230 copies.

Track listing

CD

DVD

References

External links
 

TVXQ albums
2014 live albums
SM Entertainment live albums
Korean-language live albums
Japanese-language live albums
Live electropop albums